

Earconwald or Erkenwald (died 693) was Bishop of London  between 675 and 693.

Life
Earconwald was born at Lindsey in Lincolnshire, and was supposedly of royal ancestry. In 666, he established two Benedictine abbeys, Chertsey Abbey in Surrey for men, and Barking Abbey for women. His sister, Æthelburg, was Abbess of Barking, while he served as Abbot of Chertsey.

In 675, Earconwald became the Bishop of London, after Wine. He was the choice of Archbishop Theodore of Canterbury. While bishop, he contributed to King Ine of Wessex's law code, and is mentioned specifically in the code as a contributor.  Current historical scholarship credits Earconwald with a large role in the evolution of Anglo-Saxon charters, and it is possible that he drafted the charter of Caedwalla to Farnham. King Ine of Wessex named Earconwald as an advisor on his laws.

Earconwald died in 693 and his remains were buried at Old St Paul's Cathedral. His grave was a popular place of pilgrimage in the Middle Ages, and was destroyed together with a number of other tombs in the cathedral during the Reformation.

Earconwald's feast day is 30 April, with translations being celebrated on 1 February, 13 May and 14 November. He is a patron saint of London.

See also
 St. Erkenwald (poem)

Notes

Citations

References

External links
 

630s births
693 deaths
Abbots of Chertsey
Mercian saints
Anglo-Saxon Benedictines
Bishops of London
7th-century English bishops
7th-century Christian saints
7th-century Latin writers
7th-century English writers
Burials at St Paul's Cathedral